Sunday Drive is the fifth studio album by American country music singer Brett Eldredge. It was released on July 10, 2020 via Warner Records Nashville.

Content
The album is Eldredge's first in three years, following his 2017 self-titled album. Before working on the album, Eldredge disassociated himself from social media. In the process of writing songs for the album, Eldredge worked with solely his guitar and a notepad. Sunday Drive was produced by Ian Fitchuk and Daniel Tashian, who also worked on Kacey Musgraves' Golden Hour two years prior. In the process of recording the album, Eldredge took Fitchuk and Tashian to his hometown of Paris, Illinois to show the two the "Midwest values" which he felt were part of his life. They then recorded the album at Shirk Studios in Chicago. "Gabrielle" is the album's lead single.

Track listing

Personnel
Adapted from the album's liner notes.

Vocals
 Brett Eldredge – vocals , background vocals 
 Sarah Buxton – background vocals 
 Daniel Tashian – background vocals 

Instrumentation

 Ian Fitchuk – drums , percussion , bass , congas , acoustic guitar , piano , organ , upright piano , Hammond B3 
 Daniel Tashian – bass , acoustic guitar , electric guitar , electric mandolin , mandolin , lap steel guitar , hi-strung guitar , hi-strung acoustic guitar , piano , upright piano , claps 
 Josh Moore – piano , upright piano , organ , Mellotron , synthesizer , keyboards , Wurlitzer , pump organ , percussion loops , claps , percussion , acoustic guitar , hi-strung guitar , hi-strung acoustic guitar , bass 
 Tom Bukovac – electric guitar , 12-string electric guitar 

 Alicia Engstrom – violin 
 Kristin Weber – violin 
 Betsy Lamb – viola 
 Austin Hoke – cello 
 Leif Shires – trumpet 
 Sarah Robinson – French horn 
 Oscar Utterstrom – trombone 
 Tyler Summers – tenor saxophone 

Technical

 Ian Fitchuk – producer
 Daniel Tashian – producer
 Ryan Hewitt – mixing 

 Sean Williamson – assistant engineer
 Josh Moore – editing
 Jordan Lehning – editing, strings and horns arrangement 

Imagery
 Mike Dupree – creative direction
 Mike Moore – art direction and design
 Greg Noire – photography
 Katy Robbins – styling
 Kirsten Kelly – grooming

Charts

References

2020 albums
Brett Eldredge albums
Warner Records albums